Auli Kyllikki Saari (December 6, 1935 – May 17, 1953) was a 17-year-old Finnish girl whose murder in 1953 became one of the most infamous cases of homicide in Finland's history. Her murder in Isojoki remains unsolved.

Background information
Kyllikki Saari was last seen alive on May 17, 1953. She was cycling to her home in Isojoki from a prayer meeting in Merikarvia when, it is believed, she was attacked by an unidentified person. The authorities speculated that the murderer may have had a sexual motive, but no evidence has been produced to support this theory. Although the crime received notable media attention, the murderer has never been identified. Saari's remains were found on October 11, 1953 in a bog. Her bicycle was discovered in a marshy area later that year. Funeral services were held at Isojoki Church on October 25; an estimated 25,000 people attended.

Suspects

Kauko Kanervo
Initially, the prime suspect in the case was Kauko Kanervo, a parish priest who remained under investigation for several years. Kanervo had moved to Merikarvia three weeks before the murder, and had been reported as having been in the area on the evening of Saari's disappearance. An investigation determined Kanervo had been dean of the party and spent the late night hours in the parsonage. With all but 20 minutes of his time accounted for, the authorities deduced the priest could not have had enough time to go to Isojoki (60 kilometres away from Merikarvia), as he did not have a driver's license or an automobile.

Hans Assmann

The wife of Hans Assmann, an alleged KGB spy and suspect in the 1960 Lake Bodom murders, reported that her husband and his driver were near Isojoki at the time of the murder. Assmann also owned a light-brown Opel, the same type of car several witnesses had seen near the murder scene. Assmann's wife also reported that one of her husband's socks was missing and his shoes were wet when he returned home the evening of the murder. There were also dents in the car. A few days later, the two men allegedly left again, but this time they brought a shovel with them. Later investigators determined that Saari's murderer must have been left-handed, which Assmann was. 

In 1997, Assmann reportedly confessed his involvement in the crime to a former police officer, Matti Paloaro, and claimed responsibility for Saari's death. Assmann claimed the death was caused by an automobile accident when his car, driven by his chauffeur, collided with Saari; to conceal the evidence of the driver's involvement, the two men staged the case as a murder. According to Paloaro, Assmann said on his deathbed, "One thing however, I can tell you right away ... because it is the oldest one, and in a way it was an accident, that had to be covered up. Otherwise, our trip would have been revealed. Even though my friend was a good driver, the accident was unavoidable. I assume you know what I mean."

Vihtori Lehmusviita
Vihtori Lehmusviita was in a mental hospital for long periods, and died in 1967, following which his case was set aside. The man police generally held as a murderer was, at the time, a 38-year-old Isojoki resident living within a 1–2 km radius of the murder scene. In the 1940s, Lehmusviita was found guilty of a sexual offense, and was determined to have a mental illness. The police suspected that Lehmusviita was aided in covering up the crime from a 37-year-old brother-in-law, who had a criminal background. Both Lehmusviita and his brother-in-law knew the local terrain very well, as they had a common working field located fifty meters from where Saari was found. There was a shovel in the field that was used to dig the grave.

Lehmusviita's mother and sister gave him an alibi for the evening of the murder, saying that he was in bed by 19:00 after drinking heavily. When Lehmusviita was interrogated, he said that Saari was no longer alive, and that her body would never be found. Subsequently, he withdrew his statement, claiming that he had been misunderstood. Lehmusviita and his brother-in-law were questioned in the autumn of 1953. Shortly after this incident, the brother-in-law moved to Central Ostrobothnia, and then to Sweden. Lehmusviita was questioned again while he was in a mental hospital for treatment, but his doctor halted the interview when his behavior became strange and confused.

See also 
List of solved missing person cases
List of unsolved murders
Lake Bodom murders – unsolved Finnish triple murder case from 1960
Oven homicide case – unsolved Finnish murder case from 1960
Viking Sally murder mystery – unsolved murder case from 1987, on board the ferry MS Viking Sally
Ulvila murder – unsolved Finnish murder case from 2006

References

External links

1935 births
1950s missing person cases
1953 deaths
Female murder victims
Finnish murder victims
Formerly missing people
Missing person cases in Finland
Murdered Finnish children
Unsolved murders in Finland
Incidents of violence against girls
Violence against women in Finland